Kachcha Chor is a 1977 Bollywood drama film starring Randhir Kapoor, Rekha in lead roles and directed by Jambu.

Synopsis
Shyam (Randhir Kapoor), an educated unemployed youth, out of his sheer poverty, makes an attempt to rob Asha (Rekha), an NGO worker. Asha being a Good Samaritan asks Shyam to join her NGO and give up all his wrongdoings.

Cast
Randhir Kapoor as Shyam
Rekha as Asha
Helen as Mona
Ranjeet as Boss
Jagdeep as Popatlal

Soundtrack

External links
 

1977 films
1970s Hindi-language films
Films scored by Laxmikant–Pyarelal